Graeme Clyne (born 21 July 1941) is  a former Australian rules footballer who played with Fitzroy in the Victorian Football League (VFL).

Notes

External links 
		

Living people
1941 births
Australian rules footballers from Victoria (Australia)
Fitzroy Football Club players
Warracknabeal Football Club players